The 12th Virginia Cavalry Regiment was a cavalry regiment raised in Virginia for service in the Confederate States Army during the American Civil War. It fought mostly with the Army of Northern Virginia.

History
Virginia's 12th Cavalry Regiment (originally called 10th Regiment) was organized at Conrad's Store, Virginia, in June 1862, with ten companies from the 7th Virginia Cavalry regiment, which consisted of twenty-nine companies at the time.

The unit served in W.E. Jones', Rosser's, and J. Dearing's Brigade, Army of Northern Virginia. It fought in Northern Virginia, in the Maryland Campaign, at Brandy Station, then was involved in various conflicts in the western part of Virginia. The regiment continued the fight at Bristoe and Mine Run, in the battles around The Wilderness and Cold Harbor, and in Early's operations in the Shenandoah Valley.

During mid-April, 1865, it disbanded. The field officers were Colonel Asher W. Harman, Lieutenant Colonels Richard H. Burks and Thomas B. Massie, and Major John L. Knott.

See also

List of Virginia Civil War units
List of West Virginia Civil War Confederate units

References

Further reading
 Baylor, George. Bull run to Bull run; or, Four years in the army of northern Virginia. Containing a detailed account of the career and adventures of the Baylor Light Horse, Company B., Twelfth Virginia Cavalry, C. S. A., with leaves from my scrap-book. Richmond, B. F. Johnson Publishing Company, 1900.

External links

Units and formations of the Confederate States Army from Virginia
Berkeley County, West Virginia, in the American Civil War
1862 establishments in Virginia
Military units and formations established in 1862
1865 disestablishments in Virginia
Military units and formations disestablished in 1865